Love Does Not Win Elections is a political book by Nigerian author and lawyer Ayisha Osori. It was published in 2017 by Narrative Landscape Press.

Development 
In 2014 Osori contested the primaries for a seat in the National Assembly  under the People's Democratic Party but lost. After she was defeated, she wrote the book as a documentary of her experience.

Plot summary 
Osori wrote mostly about the gender biased system in the Nigerian electoral system. The book provides insight into the role that money plays in Nigerian elections.

Reception 
It was listed as a must read on Nigerian politics by Daily Trust. Laura Seay writing for The Washington Post said "It's a sharp, witty and often infuriating narrative of how patronage politics, sexism and ethnicity can confound candidates."

References 

2017 non-fiction books
Political books
2017 Nigerian books